Anolis aequatorialis, the equatorial anole, is a species of lizard in the family Dactyloidae. The species is found in Colombia and  Ecuador.

References

Anoles
Lizards of South America
Reptiles of Colombia
Reptiles of Ecuador
Reptiles described in 1894
Taxa named by Franz Werner